Jordan X. Davis (born January 12, 2000) is an American football defensive tackle for the Philadelphia Eagles of the National Football League (NFL). He played college football at Georgia, where he was a part of the team that won the 2022 College Football Playoff National Championship while being named the Chuck Bednarik Award and Outland Trophy winner as a senior in 2021. Davis was drafted by the Eagles in the first round of the 2022 NFL Draft.

Early life and high school
Davis was born on January 12, 2000, in Charlotte, North Carolina. He played basketball at Hopewell High School before transferring to Mallard Creek High School as a junior, where he began to play football. He committed to play college football at Georgia, turning down offers from Clemson, Florida, Miami (Florida) and North Carolina.

College career

Davis played in 11 games with four starts as a true freshman, recording 25 tackles with 1.5 sacks and was named to the SEC All-Freshman team and a Freshman All-American by the Football Writers Association of America. As a sophomore, he had 18 tackles, 4.5 tackles for loss and 2.5 sacks. During the COVID-19 shortened 2020 season, Davis had 16 tackles and a sack while leading his team to a win in the 2021 Peach Bowl over Cincinnati. Davis had his best season as a senior with 32 tackles (17 solo), two sacks, one pass defended, and a rushing touchdown. After completing a perfect regular season, Davis and the Bulldogs fell to the Alabama Crimson Tide in the 2021 SEC Championship 41–24. Despite their loss, Georgia was ranked as the third seed in the 2021 College Football Playoffs. They went on to defeat the second-ranked Michigan Wolverines in the 2021 Orange Bowl, creating a rematch against Alabama in the 2022 College Football Playoff National Championship. Georgia defeated Alabama in the National Championship 33–18, claiming their first national championship since 1980. Davis earned Consensus All-American honors for the 2021 season. He won the Chuck Bednarik Award and the John Outland Trophy.

Professional career
Davis ran a 4.78-second 40-yard dash at the 2022 NFL Combine, making him just the third player over 330 pounds to run under five seconds after Dontari Poe (2012) and Greg Robinson (2014).

Davis was selected by the Philadelphia Eagles in the first round with the 13th overall pick in the 2022 NFL Draft. Davis was part of a modern-day single-draft record 15 draft picks for the Georgia Bulldogs. After the draft, he signed a four-year, $17 million contract with the Eagles, all of which was guaranteed. The contract included a $9.55 million signing bonus.

Davis was placed on injured reserve on November 3, 2022, after suffering an ankle injury in Week 8. He was activated on December 3. Davis ended his rookie season with 18 tackles and one pass defensed in 13 games and five starts. He helped the Eagles reach Super Bowl LVII where they lost 38–35 to the Kansas City Chiefs. Davis had a quarterback hit in the game.

Personal life
In 2022, Davis provided vocals on the Christmas album A Philly Special Christmas.

References

External links 

 Philadelphia Eagles bio
 Georgia Bulldogs bio

2000 births
Living people
American football defensive tackles
Players of American football from Charlotte, North Carolina
Georgia Bulldogs football players
African-American players of American football
21st-century African-American sportspeople
All-American college football players
Philadelphia Eagles players